The Ngarkat is a recorded title of a tribal group from South Australia. The Ngarkat lands had linked the mallee peoples of Victoria and South Australia to the river peoples of the Murray River Murraylands. Ngarkat language has been loosely grouped with Peramangk language though not by linguists, and the grouping was perhaps partly owed to the co-ownership of lands in both the Ninety  Mile Desert and Echunga by John Barton Hack, and partly to the occasional meeting of tribes. The language of the Ngarkat was recorded as being Boraipur by Ryan in recent times  though sources were not given, while it may yet be telling that the citing work concerns Mallee peoples to the east. The language may have been midway between that of mallee peoples to the east, and that of peoples to  the west recorded by Teichelmann and Schurman. It is known that songlines linked the Coorong to the Mallee regions, hence went through Ngarkat land. It is also known that Ngarkat people did meet regularly with tribes to the east, at sites along the Murray.

Country
They took in Alawoona south as far as Pinnaroo, Taunta, Keith, Tintinara, and Coonalpyn. Their eastern boundaries reached Tatiara and about Murrayville Kimber argued that Tindale had pushed the Ngarkat territorial extension into lands properly possessed by the Wotjobaluk to their east, and takes the Jackegilbrab around Bordertown as belonging to the latter, but a distinct tribe.

Ecology
The Ngarkat lived on a largely waterless karst plateau. Rainfall varies from 8 inches in the north to 18 in the south. Winters can be freezing, while temperatures could hit  in summer, though averaging . In no part of the land was there a single perennial stream; water was found in soakages, by working mallee roots or culling whatever hollow trees retained, or rock cleavages held. Waterskins were manufactured from kangaroo and wallaby hides.

The lack of surface water determined much of their lifestyle. Neighbouring tribes such as the Warki, Jarildekald, and Portaulun lived in areas where they could hunt and trap animals, fish and ducks, and such resources enabled a more settled tribal existence. The Ngarkat, conversely, were an ever-shifting nomadic people, lacking even a fixed nomenclature for the mallee groves where they pitched camp and drew water from the mallee roots. The few stable points of return, which allowed a seasonal living base, were named and the lore of the ancestral beings of each clan developed only in such places.

In periods of severe drought the Ngarkat withdrew to the Devon Downs Rock-shelter, called Ngautngaut, on the Murray River, to which they were permitted access by a track down the cliff. In local mythology this Ngautngaut was a Being who dwelt in the mallee scrubland, who had been murdered when he knelt down on his knees to slake his thirst at a water-hole.

Social organization
The Ngarkat subtribal units were widely dispersed given the scarcity of water and were divided into six hordes, according to an old Tatiara informant
 Kooinkill
 Wirriga
 Chala
 Camiagiiigara
 Niall
 Munkoora

Material culture
The Ngarkat faced a particular problem in making implements, millstones, hammers and axes, since suitable stone or rock materials were quite rare in their area. Onsets of highly arid weather, on draining soakages, yield evidence, aside from skeletons, of tools fashioned from chert, quartzite and jasp-opal.

Despite its arid inhospitable terrain, Ngarkat territory was crisscrossed by trade routes, from Lake Hindmarsh to Bordertown, from Nhill to Murrayville and Pinnaroo, from the Wirrurgren Plain north of Lake Albacutya through Pinnaroo country to the Murray Bridge area. The items bartered along these trails were things like yabbyclaw necklaces, pipe clay, red ochre, diorite stone axes, and the like.

Relations with other tribes
The Ngarkat, who often had to seek water on other tribal lands, had difficult relations with several tribes. One aetiological legend, according to the Ngarrindjeri elder Matt Rigney, explains the pink waters of Lake Bumbunga, often called by settlers "Pink Lake", as the outcome of a bloody battle between the Ngarrindjeri and the Ngarkat which left many slain warriors in its waters.

Their lands were considered in surrounding tribal lore as dangerous and "legends of fear" circulated concerning its proneness to hurricanes, or its putative infestation by malign spirits. Its Tatiara denizens were said to prey on human flesh, though ritual cannibalism was also attested among many other tribes, and was not uncommon. had the Ngarkat practiced it, in times of extreme scarcity of food, they would not have been an exception.

History of contact
The explorer Edward Eyre passed through Ngarkat lands during his 1940-1841 travels. He wrote of the tribe (calling them Arkatko) that they shared similar "dialects" but were mutually unintelligible unless a common third dialect was used to bridge misunderstandings.

According to Richard Glyn Kimber only 50 of the Jackegilbrab horde survived into the mid-1840s, attributing the decline to disease. It has also been suggested that many of the Ngarkat were massacred though it is unclear by who. A burial site of 70 skeletons weas documented at a soakage in the Lameroo district by early pioneers.

The tribal name has been restored and conserved in the South Australian landscape by the establishment of a locality called Ngarkat, and by setting aside part of its traditional land as the Ngarkat Conservation Park.

Alternative names

 Ngerget
 Ngarkato
 Arkatko
 Boraipar. (language name)
 Baripung (barip means "man".)
 Boripar, Booripung
 Tatiari. (regional name for mallee desert)
 Thatiari. (general term)
 Duwinbarap (eastern term barap = man).
 Doenbauraket
 Tjakulprap. (southeastern term parap, a form of barab, meaning "man").
 Jakalbarap, Jackalbarap
 Jacke-gilbrab
 Ngalundji (a name for language)
 Nalunghee
 Wularuki (name for southwestern group)

Tribal exonyms
 Ngeruketi. (Maraura term)
 Ratarapa (Nganguruku term)
 Mangkarupi (Jarildekalde term)
 Merkani/Merkanie (Jaralde and Tangane term, means "enemy")
 Jakel-baluk (Wotjobaluk term)
 Baine Hill tribe (horde around Lameroo).

Notes

Citations

Sources

Aboriginal peoples of South Australia